Thrinax parviflora is a palm which is endemic to the Blue Mountains of Jamaica where it occurs in open and rocky, seasonally dry open deciduous forest up to 900 meters elevation.

Taxonomy
Some botanists recognize two subspecies, one being Thrinax parviflora var. parviflora.

Description
It grows a slender, smooth trunk no more than 6 inches with a maximum height of 50 feet. It is topped by an open crown of smallish, very thick and leathery fan leaves 3–4 feet in diameter with curiously twisted and curled, heavily veined grass green segments. Adult palms are extremely graceful due to the nature of the crown and the rather thin trunk.

Horticulture
This palm is extremely rare in cultivation. However, because it will grow to some elevation and tolerate drier conditions, it is expected to thrive in subtropical climates and favorable warm temperate climates, tolerating an occasional light frost. It is tolerant of limerock and coastal exposure.

References

parviflora
Endemic flora of Jamaica
Trees of Jamaica